Ojos Negros is the sixth studio album by Spanish duo Azúcar Moreno, released on Sony-Epic in 1992. The album's title translates as Dark Eyes and is a reference to one of the tracks included, the Chilean folk tune "Yo Vendo Unos Ojos Negros".

Ojos Negros, just like preceding album Mambo, was recorded in both London, Madrid and Miami and was a collaboration with acclaimed British producer Nick Patrick. Patrick started his career as a recording engineer for Heaven 17 and B.E.F. in the early 80s and has since gained prominence as a producer and arranger in his own right for a large number of artists in genres as diverse as pop and rock (Roy Orbison, Alain Souchon, Maggie Reilly), world music (Salif Keita, Gipsy Kings, Mory Kante, Youssou N'Dour) and classical (Russell Watson, Dominic Miller, Katherine Jenkins). Patrick's production of Ojos Negros marked a change in musical direction for Azúcar Moreno as it mainly featured live orchestrations including percussion, brass, woodwind and sophisticated string arrangements and that it combined both disco, club and flamenco influenced material with midtempo tracks and romantic ballads like "Vente Conmigo" and "En Tu Calle Sin Salida", and the Salazár sisters adapting their vocal style accordingly, even harmonising on certain titles.
 
Despite - or because of - this Ojos Negros proved to be a modest commercial success compared to the preceding Bandido and Mambo, both in Spain and Latin America. The album spawned five single releases in 1992 and early 1993, all minor hits; a cover of the Venezuelan standard "Moliendo Café", first made famous by Mario Suárez, "Hazme El Amor", co-written by Spanish singer and composer Miguel Gallardo who would go on to write several of the duo's hits later in the 90s and 2000s, "Veneno", a remixed version of "Azúcarero" and finally "Mirame", a duet with Mexican singer Luis Miguel. "Hazme El Amor" was in 1997 the only track from Ojos Negros to be included on Azúcar Moreno's first greatest hits album Mucho Azúcar - Grandes Éxitos.

Just like Mambo the album was released with alternative cover art in Japan.

Track listing
"Moliendo Café" (Manzo) - 3:48
"Hechizo de Luna" (Mene, Parker, Williams) - 4:26
"En Tu Calle Sin Salida" (León, Solano) - 3:26
"Hazme el Amor" (Gallardo, Mole) - 4:22
"Vente Conmigo" (Ledo, Medina, Rubio) - 3:59
"Amor Latino" (Escolar, Seijas) - 3:57
"Azucarero" (Amigo) - 4:33
"Yo Vendo Unos Ojos Negros" (Chilean traditional, arranged by Nick Patrick) - 3:26
"Mírame" (with Luis Enrique) (Carmona) - 4:03
"Veneno" (De La Nuez, Rilo) - 4:22

Personnel
 Azúcar Moreno - vocals
 Willy Pérez Feria - background vocals
 Jackson King - background vocals
 Cheo Quiñones - background vocals
 Luis Enrique - vocals & percussion ("Mirame")
 Luís Jardim - bass guitar, percussion, drums
 Edwin Bonilla - percussion
 Dolores Bermudez - handclapping
 Gerardo Nuñez - guitar
 Vicente Amigo - guitar
 Tim Cansfield - electric guitar
 Mitch Dalton - acoustic guitar
 Paquito Echevarria - piano
 Michael Parker - keyboards
 Randy Barlow - trumpet
 Tony Concepcion - trumpet
 Teddy Mulet - trumpet
 Dana Teboe - trombone
 Ron Asprey - saxophone
 Ed Calle - saxophone

Production
 Nick Patrick - record producer, musical arranger, musical director, mixing
 Ingo Vauk - sound engineer
 Randy Barlow - arranger
 Camilo Valencia - arranger
 Jesus Bola - arranger
 Nick Ingman - arranger
 Chris Bandy - mixing assistant
 Recorded at Maison Rouge Studios (London), Sincronia (Madrid) and New River Studios (Miami)
 Mixed at The Town House Studios (London)
 Carlos Martin - graphic design
 Miguel Oriola - photography

Sources and external links
 [ Allmusic discography]
 Discogs.com discography
 Rateyourmusic.com discography
 Nick Patrick profile, EMI Music Publishing

1992 albums
Azúcar Moreno albums